Waterway restoration is the activity of restoring a canal or river, including special features such as warehouse buildings, locks, boat lifts, and boats. In the United Kingdom, Canada and the United States, the focus of waterway restoration is on improving navigability, while in Australia the term may also include improvements to water quality. (For water quality improvement activity in the US and UK see stream restoration.)

Waterway restoration in Canada

Shubenacadie Canal
The Shubenacadie Canal Commission was formed in 1986 to oversee the future of this waterway. Locks three and five have been restored, water levels in the connecting lakes have been stabilized and a visitor center opened. The ten year business plan  for 2007-2016 aims to save four more locks and  rebuild four water control structures to make the route open for small boats from Lake Banook to the village of Shubenacadie.

Soulanges Canal
The Soulanges Canal closed in 1958. Today there are plans to reopen the canal to pleasure boats. The mission of the Régie intermunicipale du canal de Soulanges is to manage the development of a  tourism development as part of the reopening of the canal.

Waterway restoration in Finland

Suvorov military canals

Suvorov military canals (Suvorov canals) is a series of four open canals on Saimaa lake in Finland. Apart from the Kutvele canal, the other three canals spent 200 years almost untouched from early 19th century until 2003, when Finnish National Board of Antiquities began restoration works on them. Now they have been turned into tourist attractions.

Tar canals

The tar canals in Kajaani were canals and locks built to pass the Koivukoski and Ämmäkoski rapids. First used in 1846, the locks were vital in the transportation of wood pine tar to Oulu. The worn down canals were closed in 1915. Refurbished Ämmäkoski lock was re-opened in 1984, but the Koivukoski canal has been totally dismantled and the site now houses a hydroelectric power plant. The refurbished canal is not used for transport, but in summertime, tar boat shows are organised for tourists.

Waterway restoration in the United Kingdom

Due to competition from the railways and the narrow design of most UK canals (which prevented the carriage of economically sized bulk loads), large parts of the UK's canal system were abandoned in the late 19th and early 20th centuries. The rise of the leisure industry in the 1950s meant that the complete abandonment of the remaining canals was avoided.

The increasing use of canals for leisure purposes led some people to consider restoring some of those that had been abandoned. At first, progress was slow due to the lack of funding, with most of the work having to be done manually by volunteers.

As the leisure industry grew, the economic benefits of having a canal became more apparent and some state funding started to appear. At the same time public interest increased the size of various volunteer groups.

At the present time, canal restoration in the UK is carried out by a mixture of volunteers and professionals working on a large variety of projects.

Waterways under restoration

Buckingham Arm
Chesterfield Canal
Chichester Canal
Cromford Canal
Dearne and Dove Canal
Derby Canal
Grand Western Canal
Grantham Canal
Hatherton Canal
Hereford and Gloucester Canal
Lancaster Canal
Lapal Canal (Dudley No 2 Canal) 
Lichfield Canal
Liskeard and Looe Union Canal
Manchester Bolton & Bury Canal
Monmouthshire & Brecon Canal
Montgomery Canal
Pocklington Canal
Rolle Canal
Sleaford Navigation
Stroudwater Navigation
Thames and Severn Canal
Wendover Arm Canal
Wey and Arun Canal
Wilts and Berks Canal

Waterway restoration groups in the United Kingdom

Waterway Recovery Group
Buckingham Canal Society
Cotswold Canals Trust
Inland Waterways Protection Society
Kent and East Sussex Canal Restoration Group
Montgomery Waterway Restoration Trust
River Stour Trust, Suffolk, England
Shrewsbury & Newport Canals Trust
Somerset Waterways Development Trust
Wendover Arm Trust
Wilts & Berks Canal Trust
List of waterway societies in the United Kingdom

Completed restoration schemes

Waterways are listed in chronological order of re-opening. Most have been completely re-opened, but some (such as the Grand Western Canal and Basingstoke Canal) are only partially complete but have no current plans for work on the rest of the line.

Lower Avon 1962
Southern Stratford canal 1964
Stourbridge Canal 1967
Grand Western Canal 1971
Upper Avon 1974
Peak Forest Canal 1974
Caldon Canal 1974
Ashton Canal 1974
River Great Ouse 1978
Kennet and Avon Canal 1990
Basingstoke Canal 1991
Bridgwater and Taunton Canal 1994
Huddersfield Narrow Canal 2001
Rochdale Canal 2002
Droitwich Canal 2011

See also

History of the British canal system
Stream restoration
Waterways in the United Kingdom
World Canals Conference
Falkirk Helix
Shannon–Erne Waterway

Further reading

References

External links
Canal Restoration News
Pictorial Restoration log: Wilts & Berks Canal, Wantage
Inland waterway restoration and development projects in England, Wales and Scotland : Third review report December 2006 : IWAAC

Canals in the United Kingdom
Conservation in the United Kingdom
Ecological restoration
Restoration